Raphitoma sophiae is a species of sea snail, a marine gastropod mollusk in the family Raphitomidae.

Description
The length of the shell reaches 15.5 mm, its diameter 6.5 mm.

Distribution
This marine species occurs in the Aegean Sea and in the Sea of Crete.

References

 Kontadakis C., Mbazios G., Polyzoulis G. & Manousis T. (2019). Two new species of Raphitoma (Gastropoda: Conoidea: Raphitomidae) from the Greek Seas. Xenophora Taxonomy. 25: 26–36.

External links
 Biolib.cz: Raphitoma sophiae

sophiae
Gastropods described in 2019